China/Avant-Garde Exhibition is one of the most significant exhibitions in the history of Chinese contemporary art. Opening on February 5, 1989 at the National Art Museum of China (previously called the National Art Gallery), this exhibition included over 186 artists and approximately 300 artworks from all over China. Widely regarded as a pivotal moment in the history of contemporary Chinese art, the exhibition provided a comprehensive view of the experimental works that emerged in mainland China after 1985. Examples of experimental artworks included Xiao Lu's impromptu performance where the artist used a loaded handgun to shoot her own artwork called Dialogue and Wu Shanzhuan in his work called Big Business sold frozen shrimp in a makeshift market stand. These works, among others, led to the temporary closing of the exhibition.

Concept of the exhibition 
The exhibition was curated by Li Xianting, Peng De and Gao Minglu.

With performance art and unprecedented installations, the environment was more chaotic than the museum's usual offerings. Artist Zhang Peili recalls: "More than your typical art show, it really looked more like a farmer's market....What mattered that day wasn't the art, or the show itself. Everybody knew that we were making history. We were totally investing in our roles as actors on a stage where anybody could suddenly become a star."

The exhibition was shut down only two hours after it opened, when artist Xiao Lu shot her own work, Dialogue, with a pellet gun. After the Tiananmen Square massacre occurred four months later, these shots were called "the first shots of Tiananmen" by the media.

After the exhibition 
After the exhibition, helped by art critic Gao Minglu, an individual businessman in Beijing who had contributed part of the fund for the exhibition, bought the works of over a dozen artists including Wang Guangyi, Zhang Xiaogang, Ye Yongqing, Ding Fang, Mao Xuhui and Zhang Peili, at a price of 10,000 renminbi, or about $1,200 a piece. Song Wei, who later set up one of the country's first private art galleries, has since disappeared and it is unclear whether the works he acquired survived.

Further reading 
China/Avant-Garde Exhibition — Exhibition Information, 1989.

Peggy Wang and Wu Hung, eds., Contemporary Chinese Art: Primary Documents (New York: MoMA, 2010).

Gao Minglu, Total Modernity and the Avant-Garde in Twentieth-century Chinese Art (Cambridge, MA: MIT Press, 2011).

Wen Pulin, ed., Action in China: Performance Art from 1980s to 1990s (Beijing: Beijing Windhorse Mass Medium, 1999).

Avant-Garde China: 20 Years of Chinese Contemporary Art (The National Art Center Tokyo and The National Museum of Art Osaka, 2008).

"Special Editions on China Avant/Garde Exhibition," Beijing Youth Daily, February 10, 1989, Section 4, 5.

References

Art exhibitions in China
Chinese art